Chryselephantine sculpture (from Greek , and ) is sculpture made with gold and ivory.  Chryselephantine cult statues enjoyed high status in Ancient Greece.

Ancient examples 
Chryselephantine statues were built around a wooden frame with thin carved slabs of ivory attached, representing the flesh, and sheets of gold leaf representing the garments, armour, hair, and other details. In some cases, glass paste, glass, and precious and semi-precious stones were used for detail such as eyes, jewellery, and weaponry.

The origins of the technique are not known. There are known examples, from the 2nd millennium BC, of composite sculptures made of ivory and gold from areas that became part of the Greek world, most famously the so-called "Palaikastro Kouros," which are a separate kind of statue from the Archaic Kouros statues, from Minoan Palaikastro,  BC, the only probable Minoan cult image for worship in a shrine that has survived.  It is, however, not clear whether the Greek chryselephantine tradition is connected with them. Chryselephantine sculpture became widespread during the Archaic period. Later, acrolithitic statues, with marble heads and extremities, and a wooden trunk either gilded or covered in drapery, were a comparable technique used for cult images.

The technique was normally used for cult statues within temples; typically, they were greater than life-sized.  Construction was modular so that some of the gold could be removed and melted for coin or bullion in times of severe financial hardship, to be replaced later when finances had recovered.  For example, the figure of Nike held in the right hand of Pheidias's Athena Parthenos was made from solid gold with this very purpose in mind. Indeed, in times of prosperity, up to six solid gold Nikae were cast, serving as a "sacred treasury" whose safety was ensured additionally by the sanctity accorded to a cult object as well as the presence of priestesses, priests, and maintenance staff at the temple.

The two best-known examples, both from the Classical period, are those sculpted by Phidias: the  standing statue of Athena Parthenos in the Parthenon at Athens, and the  seated statue of Zeus in the temple at Olympia, considered one of the Seven Wonders of the Ancient World.

Chryselephantine statues were not only intended to be visually striking, they also displayed the wealth and cultural achievements of those who constructed them or financed their construction. The creation of such a statue involved skills in sculpture, carpentry, jewellery, and ivory carving. Once completed, the statues required constant maintenance. It is known that at Olympia, skilled personnel were employed to ensure the upkeep of the statue. In the second century BC, the prominent sculptor Damophon of Messene was commissioned to make repairs on it.

Due to the high value of some of the materials used and the perishable nature of others, most chryselephantine statues were destroyed during antiquity and the Middle Ages. For example, of the statue of Athena Parthenos, only the hole that held its central wooden support survives today in the floor of her temple. The appearance of the statue is nevertheless known from a number of miniature marble copies discovered in Athens, as well as from a detailed description by Pausanias. Pausanias also described Pheidias' statue of Zeus at Olympia. Here, some of the clay moulds for parts of Zeus's garments made of glass or glass-paste have been discovered in the building known as the "Workshop of Pheidias". They are the only finds directly associated with the great sculptor's most famous works and thus provide useful information on their creation.

Few examples of chryselephantine sculpture have been found. The most prominent surviving examples are fragments of several smaller than life-sized burnt statues from the Archaic period, discovered at Delphi. It is not known whom they depict, although they are assumed to represent deities.

Modern examples 

The term chryselephantine is also used for a style of sculpture fairly common in European 19th-century art, especially Art Nouveau. In this context, it describes statuettes with the skin represented in ivory and with clothing and other detail made of other materials, such as gold, bronze, marble, silver or onyx. For instance, the sculptor Pierre-Charles Simart produced a copy of the Athena Parthenos of Phidias for patron Honoré Théodoric d'Albert de Luynes, circa 1840, in ivory and gold, based on ancient descriptions.  The result was somewhat disappointing: "it cost Luynes a hundred thousand francs to prove that Simart was not Phidias."  Another version of this figure, by American sculptor Alan LeQuire, stands as the center of the Parthenon in Nashville, Tennessee.

In the early 20th century, German sculptors Ferdinand Preiss and Franz Iffland became well known for their chryselephantine sculptures. A number of other European sculptors also produced chryselephantine pieces, including but not limited to Joé Descomps, Josef Lorenzl, Georges Omerth, Claire J. R. Colinet, Pierre Le Faguays, D. H. Chiparus, Bruno Zach, and Dominique Alonzo.

After the 1890s, its meaning was extended to include any statue fashioned in a combination of ivory with other materials.

See also

Art in ancient Greece
Classical sculpture

References

Ancient Greek sculpture
Ivory works of art
Cult images